Alexey Vyacheslavovich Klokov (born August 2, 1965) is a Russian painter and a member of the Creative Union of Artists of Russia.

Biography
Alexey Klokov (one of his pseudonyms is Romanov:) was born on August 2, 1965, in the village called Beloomut, situated in the Moscow region. Raised in the family of the interior designer, in 1982 he graduated from Beloomut Secondary School No. 1 then enlisted in the Ryazan Higher Airborne Command School and served in Russian army until 1984.
 
In 1985, Klokov became acquainted with the avant-garde master Anatoly Zverev, who turned out to be his first mentor until his death in 1986. Subsequently, Alexey entered the Leningrad Higher School of Art and Industry named after V.I. Mukhina, which he graduated from 1991 as a restorer and artist. From 1991 to 1994 he trained in the workshops at the Hermitage (Saint Petersburg) and the Tretyakov Gallery (Moscow), and from 1994 to 1998 he was engaged in the restoration of Old Russian Art.
 
Since 2005, he has been developing his own method of visualizing desires, namely ILG-ART (Image, Line, Gold), which is a blend of art, psychology of success and chromo therapy techniques.
 
He has been a member of the Creative Union of Artists of Russia since 2009.

Work
Alexey Klokov started his exhibition activity in 1998 and is widely exhibited in Russia, Japan, Austria, Great Britain, Canada and the USA. He creates his paintings without preliminary sketches and the use of a palette-knife, premium art materials, which include Belgian linen, high-quality oils and enamels, high karat gold, gold leafing, antique objects and coins.
 
Among the characteristic features of the artist, is an open color, a textured stroke and volume. The art critic Stanislav Aydinyan calls him "expressive, intense and a prolific colorist". The works of Alexey Klokov, according to the art critic Alexander Evangely, are associated with the illustration of Jungian ideas; a "balance between abstraction and figurativeness". According to the opinion of the art critic Mikhail Andreev, his style is "dialectic in color".
 
The most expensive work of Alexey Klokov is the installation of an antique Madeira wine bottle of the early 20th century which incorporates a gold 585 fineness sheet on a background of 19th century French wine barrels. The cumulative weight of the gold amounts to 1546 grams.
 
Another dimension of the artist is a technique, which he titles "randomness". Klokov believes that at times paints may be dissimilar in their structure and that while involuntarily mixing, they may react and "boil". Knowing this interaction and "the laws of confrontation" of basic solvents, this process can be controlled.
 
At the Seyhoun Art Gallery exhibition, held in Los Angeles in February 2016, his oils of various genres  were presented which included "Harmony of Two", "Spring Solo" and "Autobiography" and other paintings. Following this exhibition, a year later in the spring of 2017 in New York Klokov introduced a new collection of his abstract works entitled "Suggestive Abstract" and "Abstract Moderne".

His paintings are included in the collections of notables, Silvio Berlusconi, Hillary Clinton, the family of Emir of Qatar, Tony Blair, Condoleezza Rice, Madeleine Albright, Boris Johnson, Quentin Tarantino, Emir Kusturica, Patrick Swayze, Paco Rabanne, and Marwan Chatila.

Personal exhibitions
Alexey Klokov started his exhibition activity in 1998. By 2017, the number of exhibitions totaled 35, among them
 1998 - Central House of Artists, Moscow, Russia
 1999-2001 - Permanent exhibition at the President Hotel, Moscow
 2001 - Diplomatic Academy of the Ministry of Foreign Affairs of Russia, Moscow
 2001 - Central House of Artists, Moscow
 2002 - Embassy of Russia, Tokyo, Japan
 2003 - Art Tower Mito, Mito, Japan
 2004 - Russian Cultural Foundation, Moscow
 2004 - Council of Federation of the Federal Assembly of the Russian Federation, Moscow
 2005 – Housing Complex "Filippovskiy", with the support of the development company "Don Stroi", Moscow
 2005 - Housing Complex "Novopeskovskiy", with the support of the development company "Don Stroi", Moscow
 2006 - State Duma of the Russian Federation, Moscow
 2006 – Housing Complex "Vorobyovy Gory", with the support of the development company "Don Stroi", Moscow
 2007 - Russian Center for Science and Culture, Vienna, Austria
 2008 - "Kulturkreis Wien" Gallery with the support of the Russian Embassy, Vienna
 2009 - Embassy of Russia, London, Great Britain
 2010 - Jewelry house «Chatila», London
 2010 - «BSI group» for VIP-clients, London
 2010 - Art-Manege (group)
 2011 - Gallery «Harrods», London
 2011 – Shopping Mall "Afimoll", a joint project with the jewelry house Adamas and Lena Lenina, Moscow
 2011 - restaurant "Casino", a joint project with Lena Lenina, Moscow
 2012 - Gallery «Harrods», London
 2012 - Sberbank central office for VIP clients, Moscow
 2012 - restaurant-gallery "Belyi Kvadrat", a joint project with Lena Lenina, Moscow
 2013 - Regional Savings Bank, Moscow
 2014 — «Royal Yacht Club», Moscow
 2014 — «I.B.Clark Gallery», New Hope, Pennsylvania, United States
 2014 — (E)merge Art Fair, Washington, D.C., USA
 2015 — Santa Fe Art Fair, Santa Fe, New Mexico, USA
 2016 — «Seyhoun Gallery», Los_Angeles, USA
 2016 – «Subzero & Wolf» VIP Preview, Toronto, Canada
 2016 – «ArtaGallery», Toronto
 2017 – The Artist Project Art Fair, Toronto
 2017 – ArtExpo, New York, USA
 2017 – Red Dot Miami, Miami, USA

References

External links
 Official website
 Official website of the project ILG-ART

1965 births
Living people
People from Lukhovitsky District
Russian male painters